Jayaraman is a South Indian male given name. Due to the South Indian tradition of using patronymic surnames it may also be a surname for males and females.

Notable people

Last name 
C. S. Jayaraman (Chidambaram Sundaram Pillai Jayaraman), Indian actor, music director and playback singer
D. K. Jayaraman (Damal Krishnaswamy Jayaraman), Indian musician
Gayatri Jayaraman, Indian actress
Lalgudi Jayaraman, Indian Carnatic violinist
S. Jayaraman, Singapore Tamil writer
S. P. Jayaraman, Indian politician
V. Jayaraman, Indian politician
V. R. Jayaraman, Indian politician
Saru Jayaraman, American lawyer and activist

First name
Jayaraman Gowrishankar, Indian medical microbiologist

Tamil masculine given names